Entre ciment et belle étoile is a 2006 studio album by Argentinian-French rapper Keny Arkana.

In 2012 it was awarded a gold certification from the Independent Music Companies Association which indicated sales of at least 75,000 copies throughout Europe.

Track listing
 "Entre Les Mots : Enfant De La Terre" 1:08
 "Le Missile Suit Sa Lancée" 3:19
 "J'Viens De L'Incendie" 4:14
 "J'Me Barre" 3:29
 "La Mère Des Enfants Perdus" 3:31
 "Entre Les Lignes : Clouée Au Sol" 3:21
 "Eh Connard" 4:01
 "La Rage" 4:02
 "Le Fardeau" 5:30
 "Cueille Ta Vie" 4:10
 "Nettoyage Au Kärcher" 3:44
 "Victoria" 3:37
 "Entre Les Mots : Du Local Au Global" 1:52
 "Jeunesse Du Monde" 5:25
 "Ils Ont Peur De La Liberté" 3:39
 "Je Suis La Solitaire" 4:46
 "Sans Terre D'Asile" 4:07
 "Entre Les Lignes : Une Goutte De Plus" 3:20
 "Entre Les Lignes : Prière" 4:18

Charts

Certifications

References

2006 albums
Keny Arkana albums
Because Music albums